Us Against the Crown is the first full-length studio album from reggae rock band State Radio, headlined by former Dispatch vocalist, Chad Urmston.

Track listing
 "People to People" – 4:16
 "Mr. Larkin" – 4:07
 "Camilo" – 4:48
 "Right Me Up" – 4:11
 "Black Cab Motorcade" – 4:02
 "Riddle in Londontown" – 4:48
 "Man in the Hall" – 3:47
 "Waitress"  – 3:55
 "Diner Song" – 3:27
 "Gunship Politico" – 5:41
 "Rushian" – 2:53
 "Calvado's Chopper" – 7:22
 "Sybil I" – 2:55

Hidden Track:
Indian Moon

References

2006 debut albums
State Radio albums
Nettwerk Records albums